Merry Christmas from the Beach Boys is an unreleased studio album by American rock band the Beach Boys. Planned for issue in November/December 1978, the content was a mixture of original songs penned by the group and traditional standards, similar to their 1964 release The Beach Boys' Christmas Album.

The album was produced by Brian Wilson during the same sessions as M.I.U. Album (1978), but ultimately rejected by Warner Bros. Records who were reportedly "highly skeptical" that Wilson was anywhere on it. Some of its recordings were later released on the 1998 compilation Ultimate Christmas.

Recording
Merry Christmas from the Beach Boys was mostly recorded between November and December 1977 at the Maharishi International University in Iowa. Exceptions are "Seasons in the Sun", "Santa's On His Way", "Michael Rowed the Boat Ashore", "Child of Winter (Christmas Song)" and "Christmas Time Is Here Again", all of which were variously recorded between 1970 and 1976. Other songs worked on during these sessions were alternate versions of tracks included on M.I.U. Album. These include that album's "Belles of Paris" ("Bells of Christmas") and "Kona Coast" ("Melekalikimaka" or "Kona Christmas").

Track listing
Track sequencing adapted from Andrew Doe.

See also
M.I.U. Album
Ultimate Christmas
The Beach Boys bootleg recordings
List of unreleased songs recorded by the Beach Boys

References

Unreleased albums
The Beach Boys bootleg recordings
Christmas albums by American artists
1977 albums